Breanne Dürenberger (born October 9, 1987), better known by her stage name Breanne Düren, is an American musician best known for her work with electronic music project Owl City and her own solo work.

Life and career

1987–2011: Early life and Owl City
Breanne Düren was born on October 9, 1987, to Jill and Louis Dürenberger. She has two sisters, Thuressa Dürenberger and Celesta Bork, and a brother, Caleb Dürenberger. She also has two nieces, Olivia and Isabella.

As a child, Düren's parents put her in vocal lessons because she was always singing. She also took piano and dance lessons. She attended Apple Valley High School.

During college, a friend suggested that she would be perfect to work with Adam Young of Owl City. She is featured in a duet in the songs "The Saltwater Room" (on both Maybe I'm Dreaming and Ocean Eyes), "The Tip Of the Iceberg", and "Honey And The Bee" and sings background vocals in "On The Wing" and "Air Traffic". She also plays the keyboard and provides backing vocals for Owl City on his tours. While touring with Owl City in 2012, Düren filled-in for Carly Rae Jepsen on the live version of "Good Time." She also provides backing vocals in "Silhouettes", a song by Swimming with Dolphins of which Young was previously a member.

Breanne sings background vocals in Jamestown Story's version of "Take Me Home Tonight" by Eddie Money. She also sings background vocals in their song "Summer" from their album "Love vs. Life".

2011–Present: Sparks and Gem

Düren wrote the songs on her EP "Sparks" while on tour. It was released by her own record label, dürendüren records, on May 3, 2011. Songs included her first single "Gold Mine", "No One Else", and "Daydreams". Rick Florino of artistdirect gave the EP "5/5 stars".

Released in April 2011, the "Gold Mine" music video features dancing and choreography by Düren and the Apple Valley AVaires. It was directed by Brandon Boulay. Düren has often stated that the song was about how she was "at a place in her life where she had many questions" and was "finding out a lot about herself".

The music video for "No One Else" was released June 23, 2011, and was also directed by Brandon Boulay. Düren has stated that the song was about being on the road but missing her loved ones at home.

In 2010, Breanne was featured on the song "Lament" by Robbie Seay Band (on their album Miracle).

Breanne lent her vocals to Ari Herstand's 2008 record, Whispering Endearments.

On March 5, 2010, Breanne released a cover song titled "Everlasting Light", originally performed by The Black Keys, via her Twitter account.

On April 3, 2012, Breanne sang a duet with Minnesota-based singer/songwriter Dustin Hatzenbuhler on the song "The Fight". (on his debut album Fall).

On March 2, 2014, Porter Robinson released the lead single from his album Worlds, titled "Sea of Voices". It features uncredited vocals by Breanne. She also has featured vocals on the song "Years of War", from Worlds.

On July 18, 2014, Breanne revealed that she would be making a new EP via her Twitter, using Indiegogo as a fundraising tool.

On September 18, 2015, Breanne released Gem - EP on iTunes.

In 2017, Breanne played keyboards and contributed backing vocals for pop band Echosmith's North American headlining tour.

Discography

Studio albums

Extended plays

Other appearances

References

External links 
 

1987 births
Living people
People from Burnsville, Minnesota
American women singer-songwriters
Singer-songwriters from Minnesota
21st-century American keyboardists
21st-century American women singers
21st-century American singers
Apple Valley High School (Minnesota) alumni
American people of German descent